Alfredo Gastón Resler (born 7 June 1992) is an Argentine professional footballer who plays as a centre-back for Defensores Unidos.

Career
Rosario Central were Resler's opening senior team. He didn't appear competitively for the club, though was loaned out in July 2013 to Torneo Argentino A's Tiro Federal. Nine appearances came in 2013–14. January 2015 saw Resler leave, signing for Central Córdoba of Primera C Metropolitana. He would appear in seventy-six fixtures and score ten goals in three years with them. In June 2018, Resler moved to Primera B Metropolitana side Defensores Unidos. After being an unused substitute for Copa Argentina encounters with Godoy Cruz and Newell's Old Boys, he made his debut on 2 September versus San Telmo.

Personal life
Resler's brother, Fernando, is also a footballer; he mirrored Alfredo's career with Rosario Central, Tiro Federal and Central Córdoba.

Career statistics
.

References

External links

1992 births
Living people
People from Juan José Castelli
Argentine footballers
Association football defenders
Torneo Argentino A players
Primera C Metropolitana players
Primera B Metropolitana players
Rosario Central footballers
Tiro Federal footballers
Central Córdoba de Rosario footballers
Defensores Unidos footballers
Sportspeople from Chaco Province
Argentine people of Volga German descent